Lolita is a 1955 novel by Vladimir Nabokov.

Lolita may also refer to:

People
 Lolita (given name), list of people and fictional characters with this name
 This section lists people commonly referred to solely by this name.
 Lolita (Austrian singer) (1931–2010), Austrian pop singer
 Lolita (Italian singer) (1950–1986)
 Lolita Milyavskaya (born 1963), stage name "Lolita"

Arts, entertainment, and media

Films 
 Lolita (1962 film), a film directed by Stanley Kubrick, adapted from the novel
 Lolita (1997 film), a film directed by Adrian Lyne, also adapted from the novel
 Lolita Anime (1984–1985), the first ever hentai original video animation

Music

Classical music
 Lolita (opera), a 1992 opera by Rodion Shchedrin based on Nabokov's novel
 "Lolita: Caprice Espagnol", Opus 54 (composed 1890) by Cécile Chaminade for piano solo

Songs
 "Lolita" (Arturo Buzzi-Peccia song), a 1892 song composed by Arturo Buzzi-Peccia (1854–1943)
 "Lolita" (Belinda Peregrín song), from the 2010 album Carpe Diem
 "Lolita" (Leah LaBelle song), 2013
 "Lolita" (The Veronicas song)
 "Lolita", a song from 1960 album Barry Harris at the Jazz Workshop composed by Barry Harris
 "Lolita", a song by Christina Aguilera from the 2022 EP La Fuerza
 "Lolita", a song by Prince, from his 2006 album 3121
"Lolita", a song from Mustard Plug's 1999 album Pray for Mojo
 "Lolita", a song from Suzanne Vega's 1996 album Nine Objects of Desire
 "Lolita", a song from the Stereophonics' 2005 album Language. Sex. Violence. Other?
 "Lolita", a song from Elefant's 2006 album The Black Magic Show
 "Lolita", a song from the 2011 Tamil film Engeyum Kaadhal
 "Lolita", a song by Lana Del Rey, included as a bonus track on some editions of her 2012 album Born to Die
 "Lolita", a song by Cheap Trick from the 2017 album We're All Alright!
 "Lolita", a song by Paw from the 1993 album Dragline
 "Lolita (trop jeune pour aimer)", a 1987 single by French Canadian singer Céline Dion
 "Moi... Lolita", a 2000 single by French singer Alizée

Other arts, entertainment, and media
 Lolita (play), a 1981 play by Edward Albee, adapted from the novel
 Lolita, a Dutch child pornography magazine published by Joop Wilhelmus
 Lolita, My Love, a 1971 musical by John Barry and Andrew Lerner, based on the novel

Other uses
 Lolita, Texas, a town in the U.S.
 Lolita (orca) (born 1966), a female orca kept at Miami Seaquarium
 Lolita (term), an English term for a sexually attractive, seductive, or precocious young girl
 Lolita fashion, a fashion subculture originating in Japan
 LOLITA, a natural language processing system developed at Durham University, England

See also
 
 Amy Fisher, also known as the Long Island Lolita
 Florence Sally Horner
 Lalita (disambiguation)
 Lolicon, a Japanese term for an attraction to young girl characters, and related media